Miss Universe Spain 2021 was the ninth edition of the Miss Universe Spain pageant. Andrea Martínez of León crowned Sarah Loinaz of Guipúzcoa at the end of the pageant. Loinaz represented Spain at the Miss Universe 2021 pageant in Israel, and unplaced.

Final results

Candidates
The contestants competed for the title of Miss Universe Spain 2021.

References

External links
Official Website of Nuestra Belleza España
Miss Universe Spain Official Website

Miss Spain
2021 in Spain
2021 beauty pageants